HMS Chester was a  light cruiser of the Royal Navy, one of two ships forming the Birkenhead subtype. Along with sister ship, she was originally ordered for the Greek Navy in 1914 and was to be named Lambros Katsonis. The order was placed with Cammell Laird and production continued for the Greek account after the outbreak of the First World War in August 1914. In 1915 the two cruisers were purchased by the British government. She fought at the Battle of Jutland where casualties included John 'Jack' Cornwell who was awarded the highest honour, aged 16.

Design and description

Based on the Birmingham sub-class of the Towns, the two Greek ships primarily differed from their British half-sisters in their armament. The Greeks specified that they would use the new BL 5.5-inch (140 mm) Mk I gun built by the Coventry Ordnance Works. This weapon was significantly lighter than the standard 6-inch (152 mm) gun, which allowed the ships to mount ten guns, rather than the nine of the Birminghams, and fired an  shell rather than the  shell of the 6-inch weapon. It therefore had a higher rate of fire with little loss in hitting power. The Greeks also specified a secondary armament of two 12-pounder anti-aircraft guns, but these were still under development in 1915 and a pair of 3-pounder guns on high-angle mounts were substituted instead.

She carried  tons of fuel oil.

Greek order

Along with her sister ship, she was originally ordered for the Greek Navy in 1914 and was to be named in honour of Lambros Katsonis. The order was placed with Cammell Laird and production continued for the Greek account after the outbreak of the First World War in August 1914. In 1915 the two cruisers were purchased by the British government.

Service

The ship was laid down on 7 October 1914, launched on 8 December 1915 and entered service in May 1916, three weeks before the Battle of Jutland. At Jutland she fought as part of the 3rd Battle Cruiser Squadron and came under withering fire from German forces. She was hit by 17 150mm shells and suffered 29 men killed and 49 wounded; many of the wounded lost legs because the open backed gun-shields did not reach the deck and give adequate protection. Amongst the gun crew fatalities was 16-year-old John 'Jack' Cornwell who received the Victoria Cross for his dedication to duty though mortally injured. Chester served with the 3rd Light Cruiser Squadron until the Armistice and was subsequently placed in reserve. She was offered for re-sale to Greece but the offer was declined and the ship was sold for scrapping on 9 November 1921 to Rees, of Llanelly.  The gun served by Cornwell is preserved in the Imperial War Museum in London.

Mount Chester in the Canadian Rockies was named after this ship and nearby Mount Cornwell after John Cornwell.

Notes

Bibliography

External links

Ships of the Birkenhead group
Llanelli Community Heritage - HMS Chester at Llanelli North Dock in 1922 before being broken up
Battle of Jutland Crew Lists Project - HMS Chester Crew List

 

Cruisers of the Hellenic Navy
Town-class cruisers (1910) of the Royal Navy
Ships built on the River Mersey
1915 ships
World War I cruisers of the United Kingdom